Al-Kifah was a fortnightly Arabic magazine, which was the mouthpiece of Jamiat Ulema-e-Hind. In the post-independence period, the leaders of Jamiat Ulema-i-Hind decided to launch the magazine to promote the aims and objectives of the Jamiat in the Gulf countries. For this purpose, an 8-page was published in Delhi in January 1973; its editor was Altafur Rahman Azmi. Wahiduzzaman Karanvi played an important role in its publication. For some reason, the magazine was published for the last time in December 1987, but it had played a vital role in promoting Arabic language in India. Often the editors of Al-Da'i edited Al-Kifah, although Darul Uloom Deoband had no formal affiliation with it.

Aims and objectives 
Aims and objectives:
To introduce the aims of Jamiat-e-Ulama-e-Hind in the Arab countries.
To publish the events occurring here from the viewpoint of Jamiat.
To publish Islamic articles.
To endeavor to promote the Arabic language and literature in India.

References

Citations

Bibliography

Publications established in 1973
Jamiat Ulama-e-Hind
Deobandi journals
Biweekly journals